Growth industry may refer to: 

 Economics of growth hormone treatment
 Increasing demand, growth of economic demand

See also
 MLB Industry Growth Fund
 Industry (disambiguation)